Thomas A. Carlin (December 10, 1928 - May 6, 1991) was an American stage, television and film actor during the mid twentieth century. Carlin was married to the film and television actress Frances Sternhagen and had six children.

During the 1950s and 1960s, Carlin appeared in a number of Broadway plays, including Time Limit, A Thousand Clowns and The Deputy.

In the 1960s and 1970s, Carlin taught and directed at Pace University in Pleasantville, New York and at Rye High School.

Carlin's film credits include Ragtime, Caddyshack, and The Pope of Greenwich Village.

He died at his home in the Sutton Manor section of New Rochelle, New York in 1991 at the age of 62.

Filmography

References

Male actors from New Rochelle, New York
1928 births
1991 deaths
20th-century American male actors
American male stage actors
American male television actors
American male film actors